Hundhammeren is a village in the municipality of Malvik in Trøndelag county, Norway.

The villages of Hundhammeren, Vikhammer, Saksvik (all in Malvik), and Væretrøa (in Trondheim) together form an urban area called Malvik. This area is the most populous urban area in the municipality.

References

Villages in Trøndelag
Malvik